Franco Massimo (born 23 September 1968) is an English former professional footballer who played as a forward in the Football League for Brighton & Hove Albion.

Club career
Massimo started his career as an apprentice at Brighton & Hove Albion and made his first team debut in April 1986 as a substitute in a 2–0 defeat to Shrewsbury Town. He only made one more substitute appearance for the first team during the 1986–87 season before he was released. He had a short spell at Southern League Premier Division side Crawley Town in the 1987–88 season, making eight appearances in all competitions and scoring four goals. He later played for a host of non-league clubs.

After retiring from professional football he later became a police officer.

References

1968 births
Living people
People from Horsham
Footballers from West Sussex
English footballers
English people of Italian descent
Association football forwards
Brighton & Hove Albion F.C. players
Southwick F.C. players
Crawley Town F.C. players
Worthing F.C. players
Horsham F.C. players
Dorking F.C. players
Three Bridges F.C. players
Steyning Town F.C. players
Horsham YMCA F.C. players
English Football League players
Southern Football League players